Oh, Lady, Lady is a lost 1920 American silent comedy romance film directed by Major Maurice Campbell and starring Bebe Daniels. It is based on a popular 1918 Broadway stage musical, Oh, Lady! Lady!!

Maurice Campbell was the husband of actress Henrietta Crosman. He usually worked on Broadway as a director or producer. Oh, Lady, Lady is his first feature-length directorial silent film effort.

Plot
As described in a film magazine, Mary Barber (Daniels) returns to her birthplace as Rita Rooke, an actress, and finds her former sweetheart Willoughby Finch engaged and about to be married to a Miss Farringdon (Woods). She telephones Finch that she is in town and will call on him at 4 p.m. A rehearsal of the wedding ceremony is scheduled for 5 o'clock. A reporter is called in to assist Finch out of his dilemma. He suggests getting someone to pose as Finch's sweetheart to get him out of difficulty. The reporter gets the actress to dress as a vamp and appear on the scene. Complications follow when Mary mistakes the rehearsal for the wedding ceremony. The engagement between Molly Farringdon and Finch is broken. Then when she attempts to straighten things out, Mary is found at Finch's studio by Molly. Eventually explanations are made to clear things up.

Cast
Bebe Daniels as Mary Barber
Harrison Ford as Hale Underwood
Walter Hiers as Willoughby Finch
Charlotte Woods as Molly Farringdon
Lillian Langdon as Mrs. Farringdon
Jack Doud as Alec Smart
Barbara Maier as Little Girl (unbilled)

References

External links

Still with Bebe Daniels and Walter Hiers

1920 films
American silent feature films
American films based on plays
Films based on musicals
Films based on works by P. G. Wodehouse
1920 romantic comedy films
American romantic comedy films
American black-and-white films
Lost American films
Films directed by Maurice Campbell
Lost comedy films
1920 lost films
1920s American films
Silent romantic comedy films
Silent American comedy films
1920s English-language films